8I or 8-I can refer to:

8i (virtual reality), a New Zealand-based virtual reality company 8iestablished in 2014
IATA code for MyAir
PowerXCell 8i, IBM model of  Cell (microprocessor)
747-8i, a model of Boeing 747 
SBB-CFF-FFS Ce 6/8  I
ISO-8859-8-I

See also
I8 (disambiguation)